Soft Vengeance is an album released in 1996 by Manfred Mann's Earth Band.

Track listing 
"Pleasure and Pain" (Mike Chapman, Holly Knight) – 5:39
"Play with Fire" (Mick Jagger, Keith Richards) – 3:58
"Nothing Ever Happens" (Justin Currie) – 4:10
"Shelter from the Storm" (Bob Dylan) – 6:06
"Tumbling Ball" (Mark Spiro) –  5:35
"The Price I Pay" (Robert Cray, Dennis Walker) – 4:06
"Lose the Touch" (Cyril Schumann) – 3:31
"Adults Only" (Manfred Mann) – 3:36
"Wherever Love Drops (Part One)" (Mann, Russell Hoban) – 1:05 
"The Complete History of Sexual Jealousy" (Nick Currie) – 3:30
"99 lbs" (Dannie Bryant) – 2:38
"Miss You" (Cyril Schumann) – 3:33
"Nature of the Beast" (Doc Neeson, Geoffrey Leib) – 4:35
"Wherever Love Drops (Part Two)" (Mann, Hoban, Anthony Moore) – 2:00

Singles
1996 - Nothing Ever Happens

"Nothing Ever Happens (Radio Mix)"  (Currie) – 3:39
"Nothing Ever Happens (TV Mix)" (Currie) – 4:52
"Shelter from The Storm" (Bob Dylan) – 6:06
"Adults Only" (Instrumental) (Manfred Mann) – 3:36

1996 - Pleasure and Pain

Personnel 
Manfred Mann - keyboards, programming
Mick Rogers - guitars
Dave Farmer - drums
Clive Bunker - drums
Steve Kinch - bass
Chris Thompson - vocals
Noel McCalla - vocals
with
Russell Hoban - speech on "Wherever Love Drops"
Richard Marcangelo - drums
Richard James Burgess - drums
Gavin Harrison - drums
Andy Pask - bass
Tony Patler - bass
Gary Farmer - guitar
Clem Clempson - guitar
Mitch Dalton - guitar
Tony Patler - guitar
Gary Sanctuary - Wurlitzer electric piano on "99lbs"
Linda Taylor - backing vocals
Maggie Ryder - backing vocals
Carol Kenyon - backing vocals
Janice Hoyte - backing vocals
Diane Byrch - backing vocals
Stevie Lange - backing vocals

References

External links
 

Manfred Mann's Earth Band albums
1996 albums